The following is a list of music festivals in South Korea. This list may have overlap with list of music festivals and festivals of Korea. Music festivals in South Korea may focus on Korean musicians or international musicians, and may be either in a concert or music competition format, or both. South Korea has folk festivals incorporating Korean traditional music, which includes combinations of the folk, vocal, religious and Korean ritual music styles of the Korean people, practiced since prehistoric times. Music of South Korea in contemporary times incorporates diverse genres, and South Korea has many ongoing rock festivals dedicated to pop music, Korean rock, and K-pop.

Festivals

Gallery

See also

Festivals of Korea
List of music festivals#South Korea
Music of South Korea
Korean rock#Korean rock festivals
List of film festivals in South Korea
List of South Korean tourist attractions

References

 S
South Korea
South Korea
Music
Festivals